Rowan Sawers  (born 19 October 1954) is a former Australian rules football field umpire and umpire coach in the Australian Football League (AFL).

Over a career that spanned 21 seasons at the highest level, Sawers became the first field umpire to reach the 400-game milestone at senior VFL/AFL level, eventually retiring after 410 games, which included four VFL/AFL Grand finals and 31 other finals. In addition, he umpired eight State-of-Origin games and was involved in two International Rules tours to Ireland.

Sawers was recruited from the Southern Umpires' Association in Seaford, Victoria. He began umpiring in the Victorian Football Association in 1975, and began his Victorian Football League career in 1977. In a memorable umpiring debut, the Saints staged a mighty comeback in the final quarter to snatch a draw, but Sawers' main recollection was of his first bounce 
“My first bounce in League football didn’t bounce – the ball got stuck in the mud. Paul Callery, the St Kilda rover, plucked the Sherrin out of the bog and played on.”

His games record stood until 2007 when it was passed by Hayden Kennedy.

Sawers also umpired eight State of Origin games, two International rules football tours to Ireland, and at least one VFA grand final.

He is currently a member of the AFL's Laws of the Game Committee and head coach of umpiring in the Essendon District Football League Umpires Association. He was the head umpire coach for AFL umpires for many years.

After stepping down from the role of AFL umpires coach at the end of 2013, Sawers was approached by the Essendon District Football League (EDFL) to manage and develop its umpiring department. He accepted the position in April 2014 and served until deciding to retire in October 2020 to spend more time with his family.

Honours
In 2002 Sawers was named in the AFL Umpires Association Umpires' Team of the Century, and in 2004 he became the 11th umpire inducted into the Australian Football Hall of Fame.

References

External links
 
 

Living people
1954 births
Recipients of the Medal of the Order of Australia
Australian Football League umpires
Australian Football Hall of Fame inductees
Victorian Football Association umpires